Roels is a Dutch patronymic surname ("Roel's son") most common in East Flanders. People with this surname include:

Dominik Roels (born 1987), German racing cyclist
Frederick Roels (1891–1939), Australian (New South Wales) politician 
Louis Roels (1912–1984), Belgian racing cyclist
Oscar Roels (1864–1938), Flemish composer and conductor
Rene Roels (born 1937), Belgian sprint canoer
Willem Roels (1889–1951), Dutch Olympic wrestler

See also
Roel, Dutch masculine given name
Roelandts, Dutch surname of similar origin
Roelofs, Dutch surname of similar origin

References

Dutch-language surnames
Patronymic surnames